Health Policy is a monthly peer-reviewed academic journal covering health policy and health care. It was established in 1979 as Health Policy and Education, obtaining its current name in 1984. It is published by Elsevier and the editor-in-chief is Reinhard Busse (Berlin University of Technology). According to the Journal Citation Reports, the journal has a 2017 impact factor of 2.293.

References

External links

Health policy journals
Elsevier academic journals
Publications established in 1979
Monthly journals
English-language journals